Richard Flint (14 November 1899 – 24 September 1982) was a Canadian diver. He competed in three events at the 1920 Summer Olympics.

References

1899 births
1982 deaths
Canadian male divers
Olympic divers of Canada
Divers at the 1920 Summer Olympics
Divers from Toronto